McNally Jackson Books is an independent bookstore based in New York, New York owned and operated by Sarah McNally, a former editor at Basic Books and the child of Holly and Paul McNally, the founders of the Canadian McNally Robinson Booksellers chain.

History

In 2004, Sarah McNally opened the store as a branch of McNally Robinson, a Canadian bookstore chain founded by her parents. In August 2008, the New York store  in Nolita split from the parent chain and was renamed McNally Jackson Books. The current name references Ms. McNally and her then-husband Christopher Jackson, a senior editor at Spiegel & Grau.

By October 2011, the store had invested in an Espresso Book Machine to print both major publisher titles and approximately 700 self-published works per month. The Espresso machine remained in operation until 2017.

In 2012, McNally Robinson was sold from its founders, Ms. McNally's parents, to Chris Hall and Lori Baker, longtime employees of the chain. McNally Jackson remained independent under the ownership of Sarah McNally.

In January 2018, McNally Jackson opened a second bookstore in Williamsburg, Brooklyn in the Lewis Steel Building at 76 N 4 St.

In September 2019, McNally Jackson opened a third bookstore in the South Street Seaport. They opened their fourth bookstore in Downtown Brooklyn in March 202,  followed by their fifth in Rockefeller Center in the former Time & Life Building in 2023. 

In March 2023, the chain announced its original location would be moving a couple blocks down Prince Street.

References

External links
Official Website

Bookstores in Manhattan
Book selling websites
Companies based in Manhattan
Independent bookstores of the United States
Retail companies established in 2004
2004 establishments in New York City